The Communauté de communes de la Bassée - Montois is a communauté de communes in the Seine-et-Marne département and in the Île-de-France région of France. It was formed on 1 January 2014 by the merger of the former Communauté de communes de la Bassée and the Communauté de communes du Montois. Its seat is in Donnemarie-Dontilly. Its area is 421.8 km2, and its population was 23,230 in 2019.

Composition
The communauté de communes consists of the following 42 communes:

Baby
Balloy
Bazoches-lès-Bray
Bray-sur-Seine
Cessoy-en-Montois
Chalmaison
Châtenay-sur-Seine
Coutençon
Donnemarie-Dontilly
Égligny
Everly
Fontaine-Fourches
Gouaix
Gravon
Grisy-sur-Seine
Gurcy-le-Châtel
Hermé
Jaulnes
Jutigny
Lizines
Luisetaines
Meigneux
Mons-en-Montois
Montigny-le-Guesdier
Montigny-Lencoup
Mousseaux-lès-Bray
Mouy-sur-Seine
Noyen-sur-Seine
Les Ormes-sur-Voulzie
Paroy
Passy-sur-Seine
Saint-Sauveur-lès-Bray
Savins
Sigy
Sognolles-en-Montois
Thénisy
La Tombe
Villenauxe-la-Petite
Villeneuve-les-Bordes
Villiers-sur-Seine
Villuis
Vimpelles

References 

Bassée - Montois
Bassée - Montois